

The Britten Sheriff was a light twin-piston engine aircraft developed in the United Kingdom in the 1970s. Intended to be produced outside of the UK, the company went into receivership in 1984 and the aircraft was never completed.

Development

Aircraft engineer John Britten, who had been instrumental in founding Britten-Norman, left the company in February 1976.  After that, he began development of an economical four-place light twin aircraft, the Sheriff.  It was a low-wing cantilever monoplane with twin tails and a tractor engine in a nacelle on each wing.  Of all-metal construction (with a fiberglass nose section on the fuselage), it was fitted with fixed tricycle undercarriage and accommodated the pilot and three passengers under a bubble canopy.

Britten planned two versions of the aircraft, a two-place trainer and a four-place touring aircraft.  Target price of the trainer was £25,000 and of the touring version was £29,000.  By comparison, at that time the price of the Piper PA-34 Seneca was around £58,000. Development was to be in UK with production licences then sold worldwide.

The project team included Denis Berryman (chief designer for the Sheriff and former chief designer at Britten-Norman), Maurice Brennan (formerly of Hawker, Saro and Vickers), Ken Mills (former production director at B-N, and before that chief production engineer at Vickers).

Sheriff Aerospace went into receivership in 1984 with the aircraft said to be nearly complete. Although Centrul National Aeronautic of Romania was interested in producing the aircraft it could not fund development.
The prototype (registered G-FRJB) was never completed, and in 1986, was acquired by East Midlands Aeropark at East Midlands Airport.  the prototype is preserved there and has since been restored as the only of its type in the world.

Specifications (4-seater version, as designed)

See also

References

Taylor, John W. R. Jane's All The World's Aircraft 1982–83. London:Jane's Yearbooks, 1982. .

Aircraft manufactured in the United Kingdom
Abandoned civil aircraft projects of the United Kingdom
Low-wing aircraft
Twin piston-engined tractor aircraft
Sheriff